"Say It Once" is a song by British musical group Ultra. It was released on 22 June 1998 in the United Kingdom through East West Records as the second single from their debut album, Ultra (1999). It reached number 16 on the UK Singles Chart and became a top-five hit in Australia and Italy.

Track listings
UK CD1 and Australian CD single (EW171CD1)
 "Say It Once" (single edit) – 3:59
 "Shine" – 4:19
 "Say It Once" (acoustic) – 3:22
 "Say It Once" (Ultra Mix) – 3:59

UK CD2 (EW171CD2)
 "Say It Once" (single edit) – 3:59
 "Say It Once" (Paleface Mix) – 4:04
 "Say It Once" (Bodger Mix) – 3:43

UK cassette single (EW171C)
 "Say It Once" (single edit) – 3:59
 "Shine" – 4:19

Charts

Weekly charts

Year-end charts

Certifications

Release history

References

1998 singles
1998 songs
East West Records singles
Ultra (British band) songs